The 42nd Daytime Emmy Awards, presented by the National Academy of Television Arts and Sciences (NATAS), "recognizes outstanding achievement in all fields of daytime television production and are presented to individuals and programs broadcast from 2:00 a.m. to 6:00 p.m. during the 2014 calendar year". The ceremony took place on April 26, 2015, at the Warner Bros. Studios in Burbank, California,  5:00 p.m. PST / 8:00 p.m. EST. The ceremony, televised in the United States by Pop was executive produced by Michael Levitt, Gary Tellalian and Mike Rothman. Talk show host, actress and producer Tyra Banks hosted the show for the first time.

The drama pre-nominees were announced on February 4, 2015, and the standard nominations were announced on March 31, 2015, during an episode of The Talk.  In related events, the 42nd Daytime Creative Arts Emmy Awards ceremony was held at the Universal Hilton in Los Angeles on April 24, 2015, with Jeopardy! icon Alex Trebek and The Brady Bunch actress Florence Henderson serving as the ceremony's hosts.

Variety reported that the return of the Daytime Emmys on Television was due that the Academy hoped to rebound in viewership after the previous year's internet-only ceremony, which also resulted in a high-volume of no-shows among the nominees. The awards ceremony was also moved up from its normal month in June to April to improve participation since many shows were still in production during that time. The Academy also choose to hold the ceremonies at the Warner Bros. Studios instead of a hotel ballroom like in previous years so participants "would feel [more] comfortable". They specifically picked Stage 16, where Casablanca and other famous films were produced. It was later announced that the Lifetime Achievement Award would be presented to Betty White.

Winners and nominees

In the lists below, the winner of the category is shown first, with a double-dagger, followed by the other nominees.

Lifetime Achievement Award
Betty White

Presenters and performances

The following individuals presented awards or performed musical acts.

Presenters (in order of appearance)

Performers

References

042
Emmy Awards
2015 television awards